The United Nations High Commissioner for Refugees (UNHCR) is a United Nations agency mandated to aid and protect refugees, forcibly displaced communities, and stateless people, and to assist in their voluntary repatriation, local integration or resettlement to a third country. It is headquartered in Geneva, Switzerland, with over 17,300 staff working in 135 countries.

Background 
UNHCR was created in 1950 to address the refugee crisis that resulted from World War II. The 1951 Refugee Convention established the scope and legal framework of the agency's work, which initially focused on Europeans uprooted by the war. Beginning in the late 1950s, displacement caused by other conflicts, from the Hungarian Uprising to the decolonization of Africa and Asia, broadened the scope of UNHCR's operations. Commensurate with the 1967 Protocol to the Refugee Convention, which expanded the geographic and temporal scope of refugee assistance, UNHCR operated across the world, with the bulk of its activities in developing countries. By its 65th anniversary in 2015, the agency had assisted more than 50 million refugees worldwide.

As of June 2020, UNHCR has over 20 million refugees under its mandate. Consequently, its annual budget has grown from US$300,000 in 1951 to US$8.6 billion in 2019, making it one of the largest UN agencies by expenditure. The vast majority of UNHCR's budget comes from voluntary contributions, mostly from member states; the largest donors are the United States, the European Union, and Germany. The agency's work includes providing protection, shelter, healthcare and emergency relief, assisting in resettlement and repatriation, and advocating for national and multilateral policies on behalf of refugees.

In recognition of its work, UNHCR has won two Nobel Peace Prizes, in 1954 and 1981 and a Prince of Asturias Awards for International Cooperation in 1991. It is a member of the United Nations Development Group, a consortium of organizations dedicated to sustainable development.

History 

Following the demise of the League of Nations and the creation of the United Nations the international community was acutely aware of the refugee crisis following the end of World War II. In 1947, the International Refugee Organization (IRO) was founded by the United Nations. The IRO was the first international agency to deal comprehensively with all aspects of refugees' lives. Preceding this was the United Nations Relief and Rehabilitation Administration, which was established in 1944 to address the millions of people displaced across Europe as a result of World War II.

In the late 1940s, the IRO fell out of favour, but the UN agreed that a body was required to oversee global refugee issues. Despite many heated debates in the General Assembly, the United Nations High Commissioner for Refugees was founded as a subsidiary organ of the General Assembly by Resolution 319 (IV) of the United Nations General Assembly of December 1949. However, the organisation was only intended to operate for 3 years, from January 1951, due to the disagreement of many UN member states over the implications of a permanent body.

UNHCR's mandate was originally set out in its statute, annexed to resolution 428 (V) of the United Nations General Assembly of 1950. This mandate has been subsequently broadened by numerous resolutions of the General Assembly and its Economic and Social Council (ECOSOC). According to UNHCR, its mandate is to provide, on a non-political and humanitarian basis, international protection to refugees and to seek permanent solutions for them.

Soon after the signing of the 1951 Convention relating to the Status of Refugees, it became clear that refugees were not solely restricted to Europe. In 1956, UNHCR was involved in coordinating the response to the uprising in Hungary. Just a year later, UNHCR was tasked with dealing with Chinese refugees in Hong Kong, while also responding to Algerian refugees who had fled to Morocco and Tunisia in the wake of Algeria's war for independence. The responses marked the beginning of a wider, global mandate in refugee protection and humanitarian assistance.

Decolonisation in the 1960s triggered large refugee movements in Africa, creating a massive challenge that would transform UNHCR; unlike the refugee crises in Europe, there were no durable solutions in Africa, and many refugees who fled one country only found instability in their new country of refuge. By the end of the decade, two-thirds of UNHCR's budget was focused on operations in Africa and in just one decade, the organization's focus had shifted from an almost exclusive focus on Europe.

In 1967, the Protocol Relating to the Status of Refugees was ratified to remove the geographical and temporal restrictions of UNHCR under the 1951 Convention relating to the Status of Refugees. As the Convention was confined to the refugee crisis in the aftermath of World War II in Europe, the Protocol was made to address the “new refugee situations that have arisen since the Convention was adopted and the refugees concerned that may therefore not fall within the scope of the Convention”.
In the 1970s, UNHCR refugee operations continued to spread around the globe, with the mass exodus of East Pakistanis to India shortly before the birth of Bangladesh. Adding to the woes in Asia was the Vietnam War, with millions fleeing Laos, Cambodia, and Vietnam.
The 1980s saw new challenges for UNHCR, with many member states unwilling to resettle refugees due to the sharp rise in refugee numbers over the 1970s. Often, these refugees were not fleeing wars between states, but inter-ethnic conflict in newly independent states. The targeting of civilians as military strategy added to the displacement in many nations, so even 'minor' conflicts could result in a large number of displaced persons. Whether in Asia, Central America or Africa, these conflicts, fueled by superpower rivalry and aggravated by socio-economic problems within the concerned countries, durable solutions continued to prove a massive challenge for the UNHCR. As a result, the UNHCR became more heavily involved with assistance programs within refugee camps, often located in hostile environments.
The end of the Cold War marked continued inter-ethnic conflict and contributed heavily to refugee flight. In addition, humanitarian intervention by multinational forces became more frequent and the media began to play a big role, particularly in the lead up to the 1999 NATO mission in FR Yugoslavia, while by contrast, the 1994 Rwandan Genocide had little attention. The genocide in Rwanda caused a massive refugee crisis, again highlighting the difficulties for UNHCR to uphold its mandate, and the UNHCR continued to battle against restrictive refugee policies in so called 'rich' nations.

According to a 2021 study, the UNHCR has fulfilled its mandate to serve refugees independent of their location consistently over time. The organization has shown limited bias towards donors in the geographical distribution of its funds.

Function 

UNHCR was established on 14 December 1950 and succeeded the earlier United Nations Relief and Rehabilitation Administration. The agency is mandated to lead and co-ordinate international action to protect refugees (other than Palestinian refugees, who are assisted by UNRWA) and resolve refugee problems worldwide. Its primary purpose is to safeguard the rights and well-being of refugees. It strives to ensure that everyone can exercise the right to seek asylum and find safe refuge in another state, with the option to return home voluntarily, integrate locally or to resettle in a third country.

UNHCR's mandate has gradually been expanded to include protecting and providing humanitarian assistance to whom it describes as other persons "of concern," including internally displaced persons (IDPs) who would fit the legal definition of a refugee under the 1951 United Nations Convention Relating to the Status of Refugees and 1967 Protocol, the 1969 Organization for African Unity Convention, or some other treaty if they left their country, but who presently remain in their country of origin. UNHCR presently has major missions in Lebanon, South Sudan, Chad/Darfur, Democratic Republic of Congo, Iraq, Afghanistan as well as Kenya to assist and provide services to IDPs and refugees in camps and in urban settings.

UNHCR maintains a database of refugee information, ProGres, which was created during the Kosovo War in the 1990s. The database today contains data on over 11 million refugees or about 11% of all displaced persons globally. The database contains biometric data, including fingerprints and iris scans and is used to determine aid distribution for recipients. The results of using biometric verification have been successful. When introduced in Kenyan refugee camps of Kakuma and Dadaab in the year 2013, the UN World Food Programme was able to eliminate $1.4m in waste and fraud.

To achieve its mandate, the UNHCR engages in activities both in the countries of interest and in countries with donors. This includes hosting "expert roundtables" to discuss issues of concern to the international refugee community.

Palestine refugee mandate 

Palestinian refugees living in  the regions covered by the United Nations Relief and Works Agency for Palestine Refugees in the Near East (UNRWA) are not under the care of UNHCR.

Public awareness and future of refugees 

Several new programs have recently been introduced to support and to heighten awareness of the issues faced by refugees around the world. These two new programs are a product of the benchmarks set out by the United Nations Millennium Development Goals.

The UNHCR works in different regions of the world to raise awareness about the refugee crisis and the needs of these refugees.

Since 2009, the UNHCR acknowledged a large presence of migration and refugees in the Caribbean, where the refugee crisis remained largely unreported. The issue stems from refugees who, instead of applying to the U.N., improperly search for asylum in the United States, ultimately failing to reach their destination and remaining in the Caribbean. However, migrant laws in some of these nations lacked any protections for asylum-seekers, including the ability to be recognized as such. In response, the UNHCR organized talks with these nations in Costa Rica in 2009, seeking to address the lack of protections for refugees and their prosecution as unauthorized migrants. A refugee-seeker applies through the U.N. for placement and an asylum-seeker applies within the Country in which asylum is sought. This is why some Countries label refugees as illegal when they did not apply through the U.N. for placement and entered the country unlawfully.

In 2007, UNHCR offices in Canada launched an aggressive media campaign to shed light on the plight of refugees. This campaign was meant to humanize the refugee crisis by showing refugees living in the midst of disturbing conditions. Using emotional appeals to raise public awareness, the campaign hoped to increase the interest of particularly "30 to 45-year-old professionals who are generally well educated, well-read, but have not had direct experience or knowledge of refugee issues,” according to fund-raising officer Jonathan Wade.

In Ireland, the UNHCR works to inform the public through different channels. The UNHCR in Ireland actively pursues media relations. It also holds public events with the aim of informing people about current refugee crises. One of these is the annual UNHCR/SARI Fair play Football Cup.

The UNHCR was prominent in helping Syrian refugees in Lebanon. When the Lebanese government was unable to withstand the influx of refugees, the UNHCR stepped in and eased the displacement for the refugees mainly by offering food and healthcare. They also helped register the refugees, so they would not be considered illegal in the eyes of the Lebanese government. Many Syrian refugees are also in Jordan.

Artworks on refugee crisis and artists as activists for refugees 
Many contemporary artists had art workshops and art project and took many initiatives for refugees including artist Ai Weiwei and Anish Kapoor led London walk of compassion for refugees walking from the Royal Academy of Arts to the Orbit. Among art exhibitions and artworks on refugees, Ai created an inflatable artwork is 230 feet long which he exhibited at Prague's National Gallery and Sydney Biennale in 2018,The human rights activist has brought a 196-foot-long inflatable installation to Sydney's Cockatoo Island as one of the cornerstones of the Biennale of Sydney exhibition. Ai states: "There’s no refugee crisis, only a human crisis… In dealing with refugees we’ve lost our very basic values. In this time of uncertainty, we need more tolerance, compassion and trust for each other, since we are all one, otherwise humanity will face an even bigger crisis."

Danish artist OLAFUR ELIASSON’S GREEN LIGHT welcomes conversation about refugee crisis. In Paris walls along the Seine a photo exhibition along the banks included a 370-meter long panorama featuring portraits of refugees and photographs titled “Dreams of Humanity” taken by Syrian refugee children living in Iraq which was organized in collaboration with famous photojournalist Reza in partnership with UNHCR. Bangladeshi artist Firoz Mahmud has been conducting an art project on refugees, displaced people and minorities, titling 'Soaked Dream project' of dream and future desire of those deprived and underprivileged people which he exhibited at Bangkok Art Biennale curated by Apinan Poshyananda, Lahore Biennale, Dhaka Art Summit, MAXXI Rome, Office for Contemporary Art, Oslo and many cities in the world. The Harmony Art Collective had an exhibition of young refugees made murals together in Darling Quarter, Sydney.

Cooperation within the United Nations 
As UNHCR is a programme governed by the UN General Assembly, and the UN Economic and Social Council, it cooperates with many other programs and agencies under the United Nations in order to effectively protect the rights of refugees.

On 19 September 2016, the UN General Assembly hosted the UN Summit for Refugees and Migrants, a high-level summit to address large movements of refugees and migrants, with the aim of bringing countries together behind a more humane and coordinated approach. Leaders of the UN High Commissioner for Human Rights, UN Entity for Gender Equality and the Empowerment of Women, UN Office on Drugs and Crime, and the World Bank were present. The summit addressed the root causes and drive for migration and the necessity of global cooperation. As a result of this summit, the United Nations unveiled a draft set of principles that urge the international community to build on the momentum set by the adoption of the New York Declaration for Refugees and Migrants (2016). Specifically, the 20 draft principles focus on human rights; non-discrimination; rescue and assistance; access to justice; border governance; returns; violence; detention; family unity; child migrants; women migrants; right to health; adequate standard of living; decent work; right to education; right to information; monitoring and accountability; migrants’ human rights defenders; data; and international cooperation.

On 28 September 2016, the UNHCR partnered with the UN Food and Agricultural Organization in Tehran for the Solutions Strategy for Afghan Refugees. FAO highlighted the contributions to be made by FAO towards SSAR objectives on livelihood related activities including livestock and fishery initiatives as well as nutritional projects in Iranian schools.

FAO and UNHCR are committed to increasing refugees’ access to livelihood opportunities and reducing dependency on humanitarian aid. Of late, a joint livelihood strategy for South Sudan was launched looking to address this issue with a clearly defined action plan. The strategy targets both refugees (70%) and local communities (30%) in refugee-hosting areas across the country.

Awards 
Since 1954, the UNHCR Nansen Refugee Award has been annually awarded to a person or an organization in recognition of outstanding service to the cause of refugees, displaced or stateless people.

The UNHCR itself was awarded the Nobel Peace Prize in 1954 and 1981. The UNHCR was awarded the Indira Gandhi Prize in 2015.

In 1991 was awarded the Prince of Asturias Award for International Cooperation.

Persons of concern to UNHCR 

The UNHCR's Mid-Year Trends report of June 2015 (based on information for mid-2015 or latest available information up to that date) reported an "unprecedented" 57,959,702 individuals falling under its mandate (for reference, on 1 January 2007, 21,018,589 people – or less than half of the number in 2015 – fell under the mandate of the UNHCR). The sharp increase was mainly attributed to the Syrian Civil War, "with the outbreak of armed crises or the deterioration of ongoing ones in countries like Afghanistan, Burundi, Democratic Republic of the Congo, Mali, Somalia, South Sudan and the Ukraine contributing to prevailing trends."

Persons of concern include refugees and asylum-seekers, people in refugee-like conditions, internally-displaced people (IDPs), stateless persons and "others of concern to the UNHCR". Sorted by the UNHCR bureau in which refuge or asylum is sought, the number for June 2015 included:
 16,796,426 in the Middle East and North Africa, of which
 2,941,121 are refugees
 64,166 are in refugee-like situations
 109,847 have pending asylum cases
 374,309 are stateless ("persons not considered as nationals by any State")
 13,297,101 are IDPs or people in IDP-like situations assisted by the UNHCR
 9,694,535 in the Asia and Pacific bureau, of which
 3,506,644 are refugees
 278,350 are in refugee-like situations
 133,894 have pending asylum cases
 1,801,802 are stateless ("persons not considered as nationals by any State")
 2,965,211 are IDPs or people in IDP-like situations assisted by the UNHCR
8,451,275 in East and Horn of Africa, of which
 2,713,748 are refugees
 33,553 are in refugee-like situations
 108,016 have pending asylum cases
 233,726 are stateless ("persons not considered as nationals by any State"
 5,119,463 are IDPs or people in IDP-like situations assisted by the UNHCR
7,726,594 in the Americas, of which
 501,049 are refugees
 251,888 are in refugee-like situations
 276,394 have pending asylum cases
 136,413 are stateless ("persons not considered as nationals by any State")
 6,520,270 are IDPs or people in IDP-like situations assisted by the UNHCR
 7,585,581 in Europe, of which
 3,506,644 are refugees
 14,261 are in refugee-like situations
 827,374 are asylum-seekers
 610,532 are stateless ("persons not considered as nationals by any State"
 2,574,886 are IDPs or people in IDP-like situations assisted by the UNHCR
 3,580,181 in Central Africa-Great Lakes, of which
 865,112 are refugees
 13,741 are in refugee-like situations
 18,623 have pending asylum cases
 1,302 are stateless ("persons not considered as nationals by any State"
 2,021,269 are IDPs or people in IDP-like situations assisted by the UNHCR
2,754,893 in Western Africa of which
 258,893 are refugees
 (Information not applicable/unavailable) on number in refugee-like situations
 9,298 have pending asylum cases
 700,116 are stateless ("persons not considered as nationals by any State")
 1,549,516 are IDPs or people in IDP-like situations assisted by the UNHCR
1,370,217 in Southern Africa, of which
 179,837 are refugees
 (Information not applicable/unavailable) on number in refugee-like situations
 860,500 have pending asylum cases
 300,000 are stateless ("persons not considered as nationals by any State")
 (Information not applicable/unavailable) on number of IDPs or people in IDP-like situations assisted by the UNHCR

2019

Staffing 
, the UNHCR employed a staff of 16,765 people in 138 countries.

High Commissioners

The UN General Assembly elects High Commissioners every five years. High Commissioners are supported by the 'Executive Committee to the High Commissioner's Programme' and he or she has to make annual reports to the UN General Assembly and needs to follow their directives. The current High Commissioner is Filippo Grandi, who has held the post since 1 January 2016. Prior to the establishment of the UNHCR, Fridtjof Nansen was the League's High Commissioner for Refugees. The post of High Commissioner has been held by:

Special Envoy of High Commissioner Filippo Grandi 
  Angelina Jolie
After 10 years serving as a Goodwill Ambassador, Angelina Jolie was promoted in 2012 to Special Envoy to the High Commissioner. In this role she represents the UNHCR and High Commissioner Filipo Grandi at the diplomatic level and works to facilitate long-term solutions for people displaced by large-scale crises, such as Afghanistan and Somalia. "This is an exceptional position reflecting an exceptional role she has played for us," said a UNHCR spokesman.

Goodwill ambassadors 
UNHCR is also represented by a number of UNHCR Goodwill Ambassadors, who at present are:

 Barbara Hendricks (Honorary Lifetime Goodwill Ambassador)
 Cate Blanchett
 David Morrissey
 Neil Gaiman
 Yao Chen 
 Julien Clerc 
 George Dalaras
 Alessandro Gassman
 Khaled Hosseini 
 Kristin Davis
 Adel Emam 
 Ger Duany
 Rokia Traore
 Osvaldo Laport
 Jesús Vázquez 
 Alek Wek 
 Jung Woo-sung
 Praya Lundberg
 John Abraham
 Yusra Mardini
 Sheikha Rima al-Sabah
  Iskui Abalyan
 Atom Araullo
 Alphonso Davies
 Tahsan Rahman Khan

Previous ambassadors include:
 Muazzez Ersoy
 Richard Burton
 Nazia Hassan
 James Mason
 Sophia Loren

Controversies

The 1994–1995 repatriation of Rohingyans 
According to some scholars, with time UNHCR left an initial preference for asylum and resettlement policies, tending to prefer repatriation measures of refugees instead. Sometimes, this might have led the agency's bureaucratic apparatus to adopt pathological behaviours.

An example of the latter might be considered the handling of the 1995 Rohingyan crisis. At the time, thousands of Rohingyans were fleeing Burma (or Myanmar), seeking shelter in UNHCR camps in Bangladesh. According to some, UNHCR has been decisive in promoting the repatriation of refugees, although NGOs on the field and the UN were skeptical about better political and security conditions in Burma.

Also, controversies arose on the methods with which the UNHCR staff was conducting surveys in the camps to establish if refugees were willing to move back to Burma or not.

See also 

 Against All Odds (video game)
 Albert Einstein German Academic Refugee Initiative Fund, a scholarship program for refugees administered by UNHCR
 Dadaab
 Nansen International Office for Refugees
 Representative of the UNHCR and WFP, London
 United Nations High Commissioner for Refugees Representation in India
 United Nations High Commissioner for Refugees Representation in Cyprus
 United Nations Relief and Works Agency for Palestine Refugees in the Near East
 UniRef

References

Citations

Sources 

 Janmyr, Maja. 2016. “Precarity in Exile: The Legal Status of Syrian Refugees in Lebanon”. Refugee Survey Quarterly, no. 35 (November): 58–78.
 Gil Loescher, Alexander Betts and James Milner. UNHCR: The Politics and Practice of Refugee Protection into the Twenty-First Century, Routledge. 2008.
 Alexander Betts. Protection by Persuasion: International Cooperation in the Refugee Regime, Cornell University Press. 2009.
 Gil Loescher. The UNHCR and World Politics: A Perilous Path. Oxford University Press. 2002
 Fiona Terry. Condemned to Repeat? The Paradox of Humanitarian Action. Cornell University Press. 2002.
 Nicholas Steiner. Problems of Protection. Routledge. 2003.

External links 

UNHCR's "Refworld" refugee document and news web site: from UNHCR's Status Determination and Protection Information Section (SDPIS) in the Division of International Protection Services (DIPS).
"Figures at a Glance" from official website
Measuring Protection by Numbers, Report from official website
"Who is a Refugee and who is not – the Crisis of Identity as a Challenge to Protection" Online video of an address by Ms. Erika Feller, director, Department of International Protection, UNHCR, in 2005
USCRI's Campaign to End Refugee Warehousing
"Prisons of the Stateless: The Derelictions of UNHCR" by Jacob Stevens
Nine Million
 
 Global Compact on Refugees

 
Aftermath of war
United Nations Development Group
United Nations organizations based in Geneva
Organizations established in 1950
Organizations awarded Nobel Peace Prizes
Swiss Nobel laureates
Nobel laureates with multiple Nobel awards